Muhammad Afzal Gill is a Pakistani politician who was a Member of the Provincial Assembly of the Punjab, from 1997 to 1999, again from May 2013 to May 2018 and from August 2018 to January 2023.

Early life and education
He was born on 1 February 1964 in Hasilpur.

He has the degree of Bachelor of Arts and the degree of LL. B. Bachelor of Laws which he obtained in 1995 from the Islamia University Bahawalpur.

Political career
He ran for the seat of the Provincial Assembly of the Punjab  as a candidate of (PML-N) from Constituency PP-224 (Bahawalpur-VII) in 1993 Pakistani general election. He received 17,984 votes and lost the seat to Riaz Ahmed, a candidate of Pakistan Peoples Party.

He was elected to the Provincial Assembly of the Punjab as a candidate of PML-N from Constituency PP-224 (Bahawalpur-VII) in 1997 Pakistani general election. He received 39,334 votes and defeated the candidate of PPP, Riaz Ahmed.

He was elected to the Provincial Assembly of the Punjab as a candidate of Pakistan Muslim League (Nawaz) from Constituency PP-274 (Bahawalpur-VIII) in 2013 Pakistani general election.

He was re-elected to Provincial Assembly of the Punjab as a candidate of PML-N from Constituency PP-248 (Bahawalpur-IV) in 2018 Pakistani general election. He defeated PTI candidate Zain Bukhari.

References

Living people
Punjabi people
Punjab MPAs 2013–2018
1964 births
Pakistan Muslim League (N) MPAs (Punjab)
Punjab MPAs 1997–1999
Punjab MPAs 2018–2023
Islamia University of Bahawalpur alumni